Air Chief Marshal Sir Ronald Andrew Fellowes Wilson,  (born 27 February 1941), often known as Sir Andrew Wilson and sometimes known informally as Sir Sandy Wilson, is a retired senior Royal Air Force officer.

RAF career
Educated at Tonbridge School, Wilson joined the Royal Air Force in 1962. From 1976 to 1978 Wilson served as the Commanding Officer of No. II (AC) Squadron. During this time the Squadron took delivery of the Jaguar which Wilson oversaw, flying practice reconnaissance missions. In 1980 Wilson was made Station Commander of RAF Lossiemouth.

In 1990 Wilson was appointed the Commander British Forces Middle East, making him the in-theatre commander for Operation Granby, the British contribution to the Gulf War. He was knighted in 1991 and in 1993 he was appointed Air Member for Personnel and the following year, on 1 April 1994, Wilson became the first Air Officer Commander-in-Chief of Personnel and Training Command.

Retirement
He retired prematurely on 26 August 1995. He was accused of using £387,000 in government funds to refurbish Haymes Garth, the official residence for the Air Member for Personnel based at RAF Innsworth. He argued that funds had been approved for this purpose, but was not supported by the then Defence Minister, Sir Malcolm Rifkind.

References

External links
II(AC) Sqn Association – Wg Cdr R A F Wilson

|-

|-

|-

|-
 
 
 
|-
 
 
 
|-
 

|-

 
 
|- 
 
  

Living people
1941 births
People educated at Tonbridge School
Royal Air Force air marshals
Knights Commander of the Order of the Bath
Recipients of the Air Force Cross (United Kingdom)
Fellows of the Royal Aeronautical Society
Royal Air Force air marshals of the Gulf War